Vega de Pas is a municipality located in the autonomous community of Cantabria, Spain.

References

External links
Official website

Municipalities in Cantabria